This list of watermills in Denmark lists watermills in Denmark.

Zealand

Bornholm

Funen

Jutland

References

 
Watermills
Denmark